Harold Walter Zucker (23 December 1917 – 7 June 1947) was an Australian rules footballer who played with Hawthorn in the Victorian Football League (VFL). He kicked three goals in his three games for the club. He also played for the Sturt Football Club in the South Australian National Football League (SANFL).

Family
The son of Friedrich William Zucker (1884–1937) and Ida Mary Zucker (?–1976), née Becker (later, Mrs C. Gangell), Harold Walter Zucker was born in Saddleworth, South Australia, on 23 December 1917.

He married Esma Mary DeVerneis (1926–2008) (later known as Mrs. John William O'Brien) on 10 September 1945. They had one son, Geoffrey.

Football
A  ruckman, he played with the Saddleworth Football Club in the Mid North Football Association,<ref>*[https://collections.slsa.sa.gov.au/resource/B+63477 Saddleworth Football Club 1936 (Photograph), Collection of the State Library of South Australia.]</ref> the Sturt Football Club in the South Australian National Football League (SANFL), and the Hawthorn Football Club in the Victorian Football League (VFL).

Military service
Having enlisted in August 1942, he served in the Second AIF.

Employment
On his return from the Second AIF, he was employed as a fireman.

Death
He was unable to play for Sturt in 1947 due to the protracted illness, from which he subsequently died at Plympton, South Australia, on 7 June 1947.Deaths: Zucker, The (Adelaide) News, (Saturday, 7 June 1947), p.3; Deaths: Zucker, The (Adelaide) Mail, (Saturday, 7 June 1947), p.16.

Buried at Adelaide's West Terrace Cemetery, his funeral was well attended by ex-footballers and members of the fire brigade. A minute's silence was observed by players and officials before the start of the 7 June 1947 match between Saddleworth (his former team) and Riverton.

Footnotes

Sources
 Holmesby, Russell & Main, Jim (2007). The Encyclopedia of AFL Footballers. 7th ed. Melbourne: Bas Publishing.
 World War Two Nominal Roll: Corporal Harold Walter Zucker (SX21526), collection of the Australian War Memorial.
 World War Two Service Record: Corporal Harold Walter Zucker (SX21526), National Archives of Australia''.
 Roll of Honour: Corporal Harold Walter Zucker (SX21526),  Australian War Memorial.
 Corporal Harold Walter Zucker (SX21526), Commonwealth War Graves Commission.

External links

 Harold Zucker, australianfootball.com.
 Boyles Football Photos: Harold Zucker.

Australian rules footballers from South Australia
Hawthorn Football Club players
Sturt Football Club players
1917 births
1947 deaths
Australian Army soldiers
Australian Army personnel of World War II